Moses Williams (1777–c.1825) was an African-American visual artist who was particularly well known as a maker of silhouettes. He was a former slave of the artist Charles Willson Peale.

Early life, slavery, and education
Moses Williams was born in 1777 in Philadelphia, Pennsylvania, to Scarborough and Lucy Peale, who were slaves in the home of renowned artist and museum-owner Charles Willson Peale. It is believed that Williams's parents began to work for Peale sometime between 1769 and 1775. In 1786, Peale emancipated Williams's parents, and Williams's father, Scarborough, changed his name to John Williams and passed along his new last name to his son.

Although Williams's parents were freed, the law mandated that the nine-year-old Moses remain in Peale's service until his twenty-seventh birthday and so Williams grew up in the Peale household among Peale's many artistic children, including Rembrandt Peale, Raphaelle Peale, Franklin Peale and Titian Ramsay Peale.

Silhouette maker
Growing up in the Peale household, Williams was instructed in skills that would help him to work at Peale's Museum, including taxidermy, object display, and silhouette-making. As a slave, he was not taught the "higher art" of painting.

After showing skill at silhouette-making, Williams was given a physionotrace machine to make silhouettes, and he continued to work at Peale's Museum as a freed man and a professional silhouettist who made black-and-white paper silhouettes for visitors of the museum.

Williams also created silhouettes of the Peale family, including Charles Willson Peale and his wife, Elizabeth. Williams made over 8,000 silhouettes during his first year working at Peale's Museum. He earned between 6 and 8 cents for every silhouette that he cut. With the money that Williams earned making silhouettes, Williams bought his own home and married.

By 1823, silhouette-cutting as a profession was in decline, and Williams had to sell his home. According to the Author's Note in "The Poison Place,  a novel about Moses Williams, he was listed in city directories as a profile cutter until 1833.

Public institutions
Williams' silhouettes can be found in a number of institutions, including the following:

Philadelphia Museum of Art 
Museum of Fine Arts, Houston
Library Company of Philadelphia

References

1777 births
1825 deaths
African-American artists
19th-century American artists
Silhouettists
Artists from Philadelphia
18th-century American slaves
Free Negroes